Ninon Lemarchand (born 20 May 2003) is a French professional squash player. She competed at the 2019 Women's World Junior Squash Championships. She achieved her highest career PSA ranking of 171 in May 2021 during the 2020-21 PSA World Tour.

References

External links 
 
 

2003 births
Living people
French female squash players
Sportspeople from Nantes